Love and Anarchy is a 1973 film by Lina Wertmüller.

Love and Anarchy could also refer to the following:
Helsinki International Film Festival, in Finland, also known as "Love & Anarchy"
Kärlek och anarki, a Swedish TV series by Lisa Langseth
A paper by the Italian Errico Malatesta discussing anarchy and love